The Frank Cadd Building also known as the Fares House, is a heritage listed building located at 33 Phillimore Street, on the corner of Henry Street in the Fremantle West End Heritage area. It was one of many commercial buildings constructed in Fremantle during the gold boom period in the late nineteenth and early twentieth century.

The two story building was constructed in 1890 and has an enclosed half basement. It is constructed from rendered stone and has a bracketed parapet with zero set back from the pavement. The roof line parapet has low pier balustrade with '1890' inscribed in stucco. On the ground floor there is an arched entrance and windows, the engaged pilasters have ashlar effect quoining. The inscription of "Fares House" appears below the first floor sash windows.

It was originally built for J. M. Ferguson, who was an importer.

In 1959 it was the Frank Cadd Company's building, adjacent to single storey warehouses

By 2004, the University of Notre Dame had purchased the building. It is now used by their School of Health Sciences.

See also
 List of heritage places in Fremantle

References

Phillimore Street, Fremantle
Heritage places in Fremantle
1890 establishments in Australia
Henry Street, Fremantle
State Register of Heritage Places in the City of Fremantle